The 26th British Academy Scotland Awards were held on 6 November 2016 at the Radisson Blu Hotel in Glasgow, honouring the best Scottish film and television productions of 2016.  Presented by BAFTA Scotland, accolades were handed out for the best in feature-length film that were screened at British cinemas during 2016. The nominees were announced on 6 October 2016. The ceremony was hosted by Edith Bowman.

Winners and nominees

Winners are listed first and highlighted in boldface.

See also
69th British Academy Film Awards
88th Academy Awards
22nd Screen Actors Guild Awards

References

External links
BAFTA Scotland Home page

2016
2016 in British cinema
British Academy Scotland Awards
British Academy Scotland Awards
British Academy Scotland Awards
2016 in British television
Brit
British Academy Scotland Awards
2010s in Glasgow